Riot Games, Inc. is an American video game developer, publisher and esports tournament organizer based in Los Angeles, California. It was founded in September 2006 by Brandon Beck and Marc Merrill to develop League of Legends and went on to develop several spin-off games and the unrelated first-person shooter game Valorant. In 2011, Riot Games was acquired by Chinese conglomerate Tencent. Riot Games' publishing arm, Riot Forge, oversees the production of League of Legends spin-offs by other developers. The company worked with Fortiche to release Arcane, a television series based on the League of Legends universe.

Riot Games operates 12 international League of Legends esports leagues, the League of Legends World Championship and the Valorant Champions Tour. The company, which had 24 offices worldwide as of 2018, sells corporate sponsorships, merchandise, and streaming rights for its leagues. Riot has faced allegations and lawsuits claiming a toxic workplace culture, including gender discrimination and sexual harassment. The company was criticized for its use of forced arbitration in response to these allegations.

History 
Riot Games' founders Brandon "Ryze" Beck and Marc "Tryndamere" Merrill became friends while roommates at the University of Southern California, where the two studied business. Beck and Merrill believed too many video game developers diverted their focus from game to game too often, distinguishing Defense of the Ancients as an indication that games could be supported and monetized long-term. They also drew inspiration from Asian video game designers who released their games for no up-front cost and instead charged for additional perks.

Beck and Merrill sought funding from family and angel investors, raising  to launch their company. Riot Games was established in September 2006 in Santa Monica, California. The first person Riot Games recruited was Steve "Guinsoo" Feak, one of the early developers of DotA Allstars, a game considered to have been foundational to the MOBA genre. As they refined League of Legends initial creation, they pitched investors a video game company rooted in e-commerce. Merrill said that they approached publishers who were baffled by the game's lack of a single-player mode and free-to-play business model. After several rounds of funding totaling , including investments by the Benchmark and FirstMark Capital venture capital firms, as well as Chinese holding company Tencent, who would later become League of Legends distributor in China, and then the parent company of Riot Games.

Following six months of beta tests, Riot Games released League of Legends as a free-to-play game on October 27, 2009. Their game designers and executives participated in online forums to make adjustments based on player feedback. On May 10, 2010, Riot Games announced that they would take over distribution and operation of their game in Europe; to do so, Riot Games relocated their European headquarters in Brighton to new offices in Dublin. In February 2011, Tencent invested  for a 93 percent stake in Riot Games. Tencent bought the remaining 7 percent on December 16, 2015; the price was not disclosed.

In 2012, in response to toxicity and harassment in League of Legends, Riot Games launched a "player behavior team" of psychologists to combat harassment on its platform. Riot Games' tactics to address issues on League of Legends, including an opt-in chat function between opposing players, informing banned players of the reasoning behind the ban, and creating a tribunal of players to weigh in on bans, resulted in a 30 percent drop in reported harassment behavior. The efficacy of their results has been questioned by players and the gaming press. By 2013, League of Legends was the most-played multiplayer PC game in the world. By 2016, Inc. reported the game had over 100 million monthly players.

Riot Games relocated to a new building on a 20-acre (8 hectare) campus in western Los Angeles in 2015. In March 2016, Riot Games acquired Radiant Entertainment, another developer who was working on Rising Thunder and Stonehearth at the time. Rising Thunder was effectively canceled following the acquisition, with the game's team allocated to a new project. On October 13, 2017, Beck and Merrill announced that they were returning their focus to developing games, aiming to create new experiences for video game and esports players. Beck and Merrill handed over the day-to-day operations and overall management of the League of Legends team to three longtime employees: Dylan Jadeja, Scott Gelb, and Nicolo Laurent, who previously served as chief financial officer (CFO), chief technology officer (CTO) and president, respectively. Subsequently, Gelb and Laurent assumed roles as chief operating officer (COO) and chief executive officer (CEO), respectively, while Beck and Merrill became the Riot Games' chairmen. , Riot Games employed 2,500 people, operating 24 offices around the world.

In October 2019, Riot Games announced several new games: a version of League of Legends for mobile devices and consoles called League of Legends: Wild Rift, a standalone mobile version of the Teamfight Tactics mode from League of Legends, and the digital collectible card game titled Legends of Runeterra, with all three scheduled for a 2020 release. The company also teased further games — Project A, a tactical shooter; Project L, a fighting game with League of Legends characters; and Project F, a multiplayer game set in Runeterra – that were not detailed outside of genre descriptions and brief gameplay clips. Project A was later revealed to be Valorant, which entered closed beta on April 7, 2020 and was officially released on June 2, 2020.

In December 2019, Riot Games announced Riot Forge, a publishing label headed by Leanne Loombe. The label partners with smaller game development studios for the creation of League of Legends games, with some games of this type already being in development. Two titles from Riot Forge were announced at The Game Awards 2019: Ruined King: A League of Legends Story by Airship Syndicate, and Convergence: A League of Legends Story by Double Stallion Games. Another division, Riot Tabletop, was announced in January 2020, to producing tabletop games; the first was Tellstones: King's Gambit, released in 2020.

Riot acquired Hypixel Studios in April 2020, which they had been investing in over the previous eighteen months to help them publish Hytale, a voxel-based sandbox game. Also in April, Riot announced plans to establish a Singapore office later that year. Riot Games Singapore is to support Riot's existing titles and will have a major focus on developing the company's newer titles. Jason Bunge was hired as Riot Games' chief marketing officer in October 2020. In October 2021, the company bought Kanga, a services firm involved in "fan hubs", merchandising, and content aggregation.

Riot Games collaborated with French animation studio Fortiche to release an animated series, Arcane. The series was released worldwide in November 2021 on Netflix, and by parent company Tencent in China, and received a favorable critical reception. In March 2022, Riot Games announced that it had invested in Fortiche and, as a result, its chief content officer Brian Wright and director of corporate development Brendan Mulligan were joining Fortiche's board of directors. That same month, Riot also hired executives from Netflix, Paramount, and HBO Max to head development of film, TV, and music endeavors built around the company's intellectual property.

In October 2022, Riot acquired Wargaming Sydney—a subsidiary of Cyprus-based Wargaming that had originally developed the MMO middleware BigWorld—for an undisclosed amount, and renamed it Riot Sydney. The acquisition excludes rights to the BigWorld technology itself, as well as its publishing arm.

Esports 

Riot Games operates esports leagues worldwide. This includes the League of Legends Championship Series, comprising leagues in North America and Europe. In total, there are more than 100 teams in Riot Games' 12 regional leagues around the world. Teams compete over the course of a season separated into two seasonal splits. Teams earn championship points to qualify for two major international competitions: the Mid-Season Invitational and the League of Legends World Championship. Riot Games' World Championship is the annual professional tournament at the conclusion of each season.

During 2010 and 2011, the Riot Games team developed new content for League of Legends; it was during this time that the company realized that people also liked to watch the game being played. As a result, Riot Games established its own League of Legends esports leagues which produce weekly broadcasts and create a professional game schedule. Following Riot Games' first world championship event in 2011, a small affair at a conference in Sweden, the company decided to turn their tournaments into professional sports-like events. It invested in broadcasting equipment, hired sports programming producers, and trained pro gamers to be "TV-ready". In 2012, Riot Games held its tournament at University of Southern California's Galen Center, offering  in prize money. Riot Games has since held tournaments in Berlin, Seoul, Madison Square Garden in New York City, and the Staples Center in Los Angeles.

The company sells corporate sponsorships, merchandise, and streaming rights for its esports league. In 2015, investors bought stakes in teams and began building their own squads. Among the team owners in Riot Games' leagues are the owners of the Washington Wizards, Cleveland Cavaliers, Houston Rockets, Golden State Warriors, Philadelphia 76ers, Los Angeles Dodgers, AOL co-founder Steve Case, and life coach Tony Robbins. Inc. cited the growth of the leagues and high-profile ownership as part of its reasoning for making Riot Games its 2016 Company of the Year. Following debates over whether pro players and coaches should have a greater share of Riot Games' esports revenue and concerns raised about the company making in-game changes prior to matches, the company issued an open letter in 2016 promising higher revenue shares and more collaboration with professional teams. In 2017, Riot Games held the League of Legends World Championship in China, with the finals taking place in Beijing. The same year, the company announced it would franchise its ten-team North American League of Legends Championship Series, which cost at least  to enter.

In November 2020, Riot Games announced the first Valorant Champions Tour, the global competitive tournament for Valorant.

In 2021, Riot began building out three new "remote broadcast centers" in Asia, North America (Seattle), and Europe (Dublin), as part of an effort to improve the scale of its esports productions using a centralized production model with regional hubs. The facilities would be capable of both on-site productions, and allowing regional productions to connect to the facilities' datacenters and use their infrastructure as part of remote productions. The three locations were chosen as their time zones are each eight hours apart, allowing them to "work a full shift and then shut down and throw control for the next productions to the next facility." The first RBC in Dublin, Ireland, opened in July 2022, in a building formerly housed by the nightclub The Wright Venue in Swords; it has an IP-based infrastructure, six studios, and preserves the nightclub's disco ball (which had been promoted as the largest in Europe).

As part of their buildout of the LoL series, Riot partnered with the FTX cryptocurrency exchange in August 2021 for a seven-year deal. Following the bankruptcy of FTX in November 2022, Riot began to seek legal methods to terminate the FTX contract.

Games

Minigames

Riot Forge games
These are games in which Riot Games serves as the publisher but development was performed by a third-party studio.

Tabletop games 
In October 2016, Riot Games released Mechs vs. Minions, a cooperative tabletop game based on League of Legends. Riot's first tabletop game under Riot Tabletop was Tellstones: King's Gambit, a bluffing game for two or four players, released in 2020.

Criticism and controversies

Allegations over gender discrimination and sexual harassment 
Over the first half of 2018, Kotaku spoke to about 28 former and current employees at Riot Games. Several claimed that female employees at Riot were being discriminated against. For example, some noted that ideas from female employees were overlooked while the same ideas from male employees were readily accepted, and some female employees were groomed for more senior positions only to be passed up by a new male hire. These employees described Riot's working environment as a "bro culture". Other allegations included receiving images of male genitalia from colleagues and bosses, an email thread speculating on what it would be like to penetrate a female employee, and a list shared among senior staff members detailing which female employees they would sleep with. Kotaku speculated that this came from Riot's history of generally catering to "core" gamers both in products and in hiring practices, causing the company to favor male employees over females.

Some Riot employees approached by Kotaku asserted these accusations were not true or were already being addressed; for example, according to the head of the platform, Oksana Kubushyna, efforts to improve the hiring process to be more diverse and inclusive toward women started nine months before article's publication. Riot Games' corporate communications lead Joe Hixson acknowledged the problems and said they did not align with Riot's core values. Furthermore, he said that all Riot employees must be held accountable for the working environment.

In the week following Kotakus article, several more current and former developers came forward to speak on their own experiences at Riot, which included claims of sexual harassment and misgendering. In a statement to Gamasutra, Hixson indicated that the company is taking action based on the story and its response. He elaborated that, in regards to claims of misbehavior by higher-level executives at Riot, the seniority of the individuals would have no impact on disciplinary proceedings. By the end of August 2018, Riot revealed they were implementing seven "first steps" to change the company's internal culture in light of the issues raised, including a "Culture and Diversity & Inclusion Initiative" priority. To help implement these, Riot hired Frances X. Frei as a senior adviser for diversity, leadership, and strategy.

As a response to the Kotaku article, Riot offered a session at PAX West in 2018 for prospective video game developers with a panel and one-on-one sessions to review résumés; the session only admitted women and non-binary people. Members of Riot's game communities expressed outrage at the exclusion of men, while Riot employees defended the decision as such gender-exclusive support was necessary to correct the male-dominated nature of video game development. Some of the feedback towards Riot included harassment and threats. In response to a shooting at a video game tournament in Jacksonville, Florida in August 2018, Riot planned to increase security at its upcoming events. Two employees of Riot attempted to address the feedback from the PAX event; one was fired, and the other left the company. Riot stated that these departures were separate from their Diversity Initiative.

In December 2018, Riot's CEO Nicolo Laurent sent an email to all employees stating that following the company's internal investigation, their COO, Scott Gelb, was suspended for two months without pay for workplace misconduct and would take training classes before his return. Riot stated to Kotaku that there were still other cases they were investigating, but they did not involve those as senior as Gelb, and thus they would not discuss these cases publicly. By January 2019, Riot updated the company values on its website, the first time since 2012, to reflect the apparent "bro culture" mentioned in the Kotaku report, and by February 2019, had hired Angela Roseboro as the company's chief diversity officer to further help improve their culture.

About three months after Kotakus story, one current and one former Riot employee filed a lawsuit against the company, asserting the company engaged in gender discrimination concerning their pay and position, and that the company had created a "sexually-hostile" workplace. The lawsuit seeks to qualify it as a class-action suit, and for damages to be based on unpaid wages, damages, and other factors to be determined at trial. Three other employees followed with their own lawsuits against Riot Games in the months that followed. Riot Games attempted to have two of the suits dismissed in April 2019, citing that the two female plaintiffs of these suits, when hired, had agreed to third-party arbitration rather than taking court action. Internally, several employees of Riot threatened to walk out, an idea that had been around since the first Kotaku article, as alongside the coercion to use arbitration, these employees felt Riot had yet to improve its transparency on the processes and had otherwise continued to retain Gelb despite his suspension.

A proposed settlement was reached in the class-action suit in August 2019, which would include at least  in damages to women that had been employed at Riot Games over the prior five years. Representatives of the class indicated that they thought it would lead to change, while Riot said that there were other issues not covered by the suit, and that they also intended to resolve the unacknowledged issues.

California's Department of Fair Employment and Housing (DFEH) had been investigating claims of gender discrimination at Riot Games since October 2018. In June 2019, DFEH announced that Riot had denied providing them requested documents and were seeking action to compel these documents, though Riot responded by saying that they complied with all DFEH requests. The state's Division of Labor Standards Enforcement also filed a complaint, believing the settlement would release Riot from labor liabilities that had been raised by the lawsuit. Both complaints urged the court to reject the proposed settlement. Riot dismissed the DFEH's larger value to the suit, and denied charges raised by the DFEH that it had colluded with the class's lawyer to reduce the amount they would pay through the settlement.

As a result of the state's findings that the terms of the settlement should have been valued higher, the class withdrew the proposed  settlement and dropped their original legal counsel, bringing on new lawyers who had been involved in prior lawsuits related to the Me Too movement in February 2020. In response, Riot said they found the  figure "fair and adequate under the circumstances" after analysis, but were remaining committed to reaching a resolution. In August 2021, DFEH asserted that Riot was interfering in their ongoing investigations by falsely informing employees that they could not speak to DFEH directly; while the court ordered Riot to issue a memo to all employees that they legally could speak to DFEH, Riot had yet to comply with this order. The settlement was approved in July 2022.

Riot and Laurent were sued by Laurent's former assistant in January 2021 on sexual discrimination charges, which included inappropriate language and labor mistreatment. Riot opened an investigation by three members of its board of directors into Laurent's behavior in response to the lawsuit. They reported in March 2021 that "We concluded that there was no evidence that Laurent harassed, discriminated, or retaliated against the plaintiff. We have therefore concluded that at the current time … no action should be taken against Laurent."

Alienware which had sponsored Riot's League of Legends esports events, ended its partnership with Riot a year earlier than their contract term in March 2021 due to the ongoing litigation over the sexual harassment allegations.

Dispute over forced arbitration clauses
Riot has also been criticized by its employees for requiring the use of forced arbitration in its employment contracts as a result of the gender discrimination lawsuit. Riot allowed employees to speak anonymously with the press, and indicated their intent to use town hall meetings and smaller group discussions with Roseboro and employees to determine future action. Riot also committed to removing mandatory arbitration in new employee contracts and potentially for existing ones after the current litigation had been settled. Additionally, Riot established a 90-day plan starting in May 2019 to continue to address internal issues related to diversity and inclusion. Despite this, over one hundred Riot employees staged their walkout on May 6, 2019, demanding that Riot end forced arbitration for all past and current employees as well. About two weeks following the walkout, Riot reverted their position, saying that they will not change forced arbitration in existing agreements while the current litigation against the company is ongoing.

Others

Freedom of expression 
Riot Games disallows the expression of personal views on what it deems sensitive issues (including politics and religion) during its live-broadcast esports events.

George Floyd 
In June 2020, Ron Johnson, Riot Games' global head of consumer products, shared a Facebook post that claimed George Floyd had been killed by police "because of his criminal lifestyle". The company subsequently placed Johnson on leave to conduct an investigation, after which Johnson resigned from the company.

Sponsorship with Saudi Arabian city 
Riot had announced a planned partnership with the developing city of Neom in Saudi Arabia in July 2020, with the city to sponsor the upcoming League of Legends European Championship series. Shortly after the announcement, fans of the game, as well as Riot employees, criticized the company over social media and their streaming channels over the partnership, citing Saudi Arabia's record on human rights and the violent attempts to evict the Howeitat tribe from the area during the city's construction. Riot canceled the partnership within a few days in response, apologizing and saying that the partnership had been rushed.

Marketing using a character’s mental health struggles 
Riot was criticized for marketing a new League of Legends character, Seraphine,  by creating an in-character Twitter account in which they alluded to her struggles with her mental health, including low self-esteem, anxiety, and impostor syndrome. Some wrote that the account was an attempt to trick players into feeling close to her in an attempt to advertise. Creative director Patrick Morales said that, although he was "proud" of the members of the team who worked on the campaign, it had "an unintended impact outside of the narrative we wanted to tell".

Response to 2022 Russian invasion of Ukraine 
During the 2022 Russian invasion of Ukraine, Riot Games did not withdraw from the Russian market after being asked to do so by Ukrainian minister Mykhailo Fedorov.

In March 2022, Riot donated the proceeds from battle passes sold in several of its games, as well as profit from some in-game items, to humanitarian relief organizations operating in Ukraine. According to Riot, these donations totaled $5.4 million.

Litigation 
In 2017, Riot Games filed a lawsuit against Moonton Technology Co., the developer of the mobile game Mobile Legends: Bang Bang, because of copyright infringement, citing similarities between Mobile Legends and League of Legends. The case was initially dismissed in California on account of forum non conveniens. Tencent, on behalf of Riot Games, then filed a new lawsuit in a Chinese court, which ruled in Tencent's favor in July 2018, awarding it  in damages.

In October 2019, Riot Games filed a lawsuit against Riot Squad Esports LLC, a Chicago-based esports organization founded in March 2019, alleging that Riot Squad intentionally infringed on Riot Games' "Riot" trademark.

Notes

References

Further reading

External links 
 

 
2006 establishments in California
2011 mergers and acquisitions
American companies established in 2006
American subsidiaries of foreign companies
Companies based in Los Angeles
League of Legends
Tencent divisions and subsidiaries
Video game companies based in California
Video game companies established in 2006
Video game controversies
Video game development companies
Video game publishers